Mickaël Scannella (born 10 June 1987) is a French professional footballer who plays as a goalkeeper for Montceau Bourgogne.

Career
Born in Échirolles, Scannella has played for Échirolles, Bourg-en-Bresse and Montceau Bourgogne.

References

1987 births
Living people
French footballers
FC Échirolles players
Football Bourg-en-Bresse Péronnas 01 players
FC Montceau Bourgogne players
Championnat National players
Ligue 2 players
Association football goalkeepers
People from Échirolles
Sportspeople from Isère
Footballers from Auvergne-Rhône-Alpes